Kool London, also known as Kool FM, is a former London pirate radio station that now broadcasts online, playing jungle, drum and bass, and old skool. Kool is generally regarded as being instrumental in the development of the jungle music scene.

History 
Kool first broadcast on 28 November 1991 on the frequency of 94.5FM, from Hackney, East London. Kool has stated that it was "the very first pirate station ever to play hardcore jungle". Simon Reynolds would call it "London's ruling pirate station" in an account of the beginnings of jungle in his book Energy Flash, whilst in State of Bass, Martin James would consider it "The single most important pirate station in jungle".

By late 1992, Kool started to promote its own events, leading to the founding of Jungle Fever in August 1993. Jungle Fever nights have been held at venues such as the Astoria and The Edge.

In July 1993, its then-neighbouring station also broadcasting from the Nightingale Estate, Rush FM, was subject to a high profile raid by the authorities leading to media accusations of drug dealing at raves promoted by the two stations.

In April 1996, Kool was featured in a BBC First Sight documentary about pirate radio in London, in which its Kool Skool club night also appeared. In the same year, it branched out by launching a sister station, Kool FM Midlands based in Birmingham, which continued until 2002.

In May 2007, Kool FM featured in a BBC London News report about pirate radio station interference to the emergency services and their use of the airwaves.

Internet radio 
In August 2010, Kool relaunched as Kool London, operating as an internet radio station, providing a live audio stream on its website as well as archived shows.

Legacy 
DJs and MCs to appear on Kool have included key figures in jungle and drum and bass music, including DJ Ron, Andy C, the Ragga Twins, Skibadee, Nicky Blackmarket, Stevie Hyper D, and Crissy Criss.

Kool has been involved in two live broadcasts with the artist Eddie Peake. The first in 2013 as part of his graduate final year project at the Royal Academy of Arts, and again in 2018 at the White Cube forming part of his Concrete Pitch show.

The station celebrated its 30th birthday on 28 November 2021, with an event at the Heaven club.

Re-launch 
On 1 January 2023, original co-founder Eastman retired from running of the station.

It was announced on 30 January, that Rinse FM would be taking over management of the station with a re-launch later in the year with a revised line-up.

References

External links
Official Website

Radio stations in London
Pirate radio stations in the United Kingdom
Internet radio stations in the United Kingdom
Radio stations established in 1991